Robert N Quintrell (1931 in Australia – 1983 in Vancouver, Canada) was a Canadian cricketer. He was a right-handed batsman and a right-arm medium pace bowler. He played for the Canadian cricket team on their 1954 tour of England, including all four first-class matches, in which he made a top score of 29 against Yorkshire.

References
Cricket Archive profile
Cricinfo profile

1931 births
1983 deaths
Canadian cricketers
Australian emigrants to Canada